The Tornado World Championships are international sailing regattas in the Tornado class organized by the International Sailing Federation and the International Tornado Class Association.

For the original open event, the most titles have been won by Australian sailor Darren Bundock, with seven titles between 1998 and 2009 and another two bronze medals. The second most titles have been won by Australian John Forbes, who has won six world titles and came 2nd twice, 3rd three times and a fourth, fifth and a sixth. The highest number of championships have been won by Australian sailors, with twelve titles, followed by British sailors, with six titles, and sailors from Germany, who have won five titles.

Between 1968 and 1998, eight people had won the Tornado World Championship twice. In 1998 John Forbes was the first person to win the Championship three times. 

The Tornado was an Olympic class from 1976 to 2008.

History
The first Tornado World Championships were held in Kiel in 1968.

Editions

All-time medal table

Open

Mixed

Medalists

Open

Mixed

Multiple medalists

Open

Mixed

See also
 ISAF Sailing World Championships
 International Sailing Federation

References

Tornado World Championships
Recurring sporting events established in 1968